Carlos Roberto Forbs Borges (born 19 March 2004) is a Portuguese professional footballer who plays as a winger for Manchester City.

Club career 
Born in Sintra, Lisboa Region, Carlos Borges started playing football there, before enjoying a season-short spell at Sporting Portugal in the capital, from where he joined the Manchester City Academy.

There, he progressed trough all the youth categories, becoming a regular provider of goals and assists with the under-18 and under-23, as City won both national tournaments between 2020 and 2022. He was named Under-18 player of the season for Manchester City in May 2021.

By the end of 2021, he made his Youth League debut, scoring the only goal of a 1–0 away pool win against RB Leipzig.

He made headlines in September 2022, as he scored a hat trick and delivered an assist during Man City opening game of the Youth League, a 5–1 away win to Sevilla. He also proved to be instrumental a month later, with a goal and an assist in the 3–1 away win to Copenhagen.

International career 
Born in Portugal, Borges is of Bissau-Guinean descent. He is a youth international for Portugal. By 2022, he became a regular starter with the Portuguese under-19s.

References

External links

Carlos Borges with Manchester City

2004 births
Living people
People from Sintra
Portuguese footballers
Portugal youth international footballers
Portuguese sportspeople of Bissau-Guinean descent
Association football forwards
Manchester City F.C. players